Mohammad Hassan "Homa" Mohebbi (born 6 September 1956) is an Iranian light heavyweight freestyle wrestler from Kermanshah. He is often confused with his twin brother Mohammad Hossein Mohebbi, who competed alongside, but in lighter categories (74 or 82 kg).

He won one silver and one bronze medal at the World Championships (The silver medal was stripped off due to unsportive behaviour).

Like many of his fellow Iranian wrestlers in 1980s, his sport career has suffered by political influences of the Iranian Sport Organization at that time. Iran boycotted the Olympic Games' 1980 and 1984, and did not participate at the Wrestling World Championships 1979, 1983, 1986 and  1987.

Sensation at World Championship 1985
At the World Championship 1985 Budapest Mohebbi lost against the American William Scherr in the final and won the silver medal, but he was forced by the Iranian Team Officials to step down the podium in order not to stand at attention for US anthem and flag.  The FILA executive board stripped him of his medal after ruling Mohebbi's action was disrespectful towards other medalists. His silver medal was passed to the German Roland Dudziak.

References

Iranian male sport wrestlers
Wrestlers at the 1976 Summer Olympics
Living people
Asian Games gold medalists for Iran
Asian Games silver medalists for Iran
1956 births
Asian Games medalists in wrestling
Wrestlers at the 1982 Asian Games
Wrestlers at the 1986 Asian Games
World Wrestling Championships medalists
Medalists at the 1982 Asian Games
Medalists at the 1986 Asian Games
Sportspeople from Kermanshah
Olympic wrestlers of Iran
Asian Wrestling Championships medalists
20th-century Iranian people
21st-century Iranian people